Princeville is a  unincorporated area of master-planned homes and condos on the north shore of the island of Kauai in Kauai County, Hawaii, United States. The population was 2,158 at the 2010 census, up from 1,698 at the 2000 census.

Geography
Princeville is bordered to the east by Kalihiwai, to the west by Hanalei, and to the north by the Pacific Ocean. It is the northernmost settlement in the state of Hawaii. For statistical purposes, the United States Census Bureau has defined Princeville as a census-designated place (CDP). The census definition of the area may not precisely correspond to local understanding of the area with the same name.

Climate

History

This region was part of the Crown Lands following the Great Māhele. There was no private property prior to the Māhele, but in 1842 the land had been leased by the governor of Kauai to Godfrey Rhodes and John Bernard for a coffee plantation and this lease of Crown Lands was sold to Robert Crichton Wyllie in 1853.   The area was named in honor of an 1860 visit by Prince Albert Kamehameha, son of King Kamehameha IV and Queen Emma. It was then a plantation leased by Robert Crichton Wyllie. He named another part of the plantation "Emmaville", but that name never stuck.

Originally the land was planted with coffee, which was not suited to the wet lowlands. It was then planted with sugarcane. Wyllie's nephew Robert Crichton Cochran inherited the land on the condition he would adopt the Wyllie surname, but he died by suicide on February 7, 1866. In 1867 it was purchased by Elisha Hunt Allen and later became a cattle ranch. It was sold for development in 1968 and became a golf course and resort called "Princeville at Hanalei".

Demographics

As of the census of 2000, there were 1,698 people, 752 households, and 491 families residing in the CDP. The racial makeup of the CDP was 81.3% White, 0.3% African American, 0.5% Native American, 4.6% Asian, 3.4% Pacific Islander, 1.0% from other races, and 9.0% from two or more races. Hispanic or Latino of any race were 4.0% of the population.

There were 752 households, out of which 23.4% had children under the age of 18 living with them, 53.5% were married couples living together, 9.2% had a female householder with no husband present, and 34.7% were non-families. 26.1% of all households were made up of individuals, and 6.6% had someone living alone who was 65 years of age or older. The average household size was 2.26 and the average family size was 2.70.

In the CDP the population was spread out, with 19.3% under the age of 18, 3.4% from 18 to 24, 25.3% from 25 to 44, 35.6% from 45 to 64, and 16.4% who were 65 years of age or older. The median age was 46 years. For every 100 females, there were 100.7 males. For every 100 females age 18 and over, there were 100.3 males.

The median income for a household in the CDP was $63,833, and the median income for a family was $67,266. Males had a median income of $48,229 versus $29,542 for females. The per capita income for the CDP was $37,971.  About 7.4% of families and 8.1% of the population were below the poverty line, including 11.5% of those under age 18 and 4.3% of those age 65 or over.

See also
 Legacy of Prince Albert Kamehameha
 Queen's Bath

References

External links

 

Census-designated places in Kauai County, Hawaii
Populated places on Kauai
Populated coastal places in Hawaii